The Pompano Beach Classic was a golf tournament on the LPGA Tour, played only in 1973. It was played at the Pompano Beach Country Club in Pompano Beach, Florida. Sandra Palmer won the event on the first hole of a sudden-death playoff with Betty Burfeindt.

References

Former LPGA Tour events
Golf in Florida
Pompano Beach, Florida
Women's sports in Florida